Francesco Modesto (born 16 February 1982) is an Italian football coach and a former player, last in charge as manager of Vicenza.

As a player, he was a wing-back or winger on the left flank.

Playing career

Cosenza
Modesto started his career at home region club Cosenza.

Palermo
In 2001–02 season, Modesto was signed by A.C. Venezia and loaned back to Cosenza. In August 2002, After Venezia owner Maurizio Zamparini purchased Palermo, he followed teammate travelled to the Sicily side.

In January 2004 Modesto was signed by Ascoli in a temporary deal. The loan was renewed in summer 2004.

Reggina
In summer 2005 Modesto was signed by Reggina in a co-ownership deal for €400,000 fee. In June 2006 Reggina signed him outright for an additional €500,000 fee.

Genoa
On 2 July 2008 Modesto was signed by Genoa for €5 million fee. On the same day Genoa also signed Giandomenico Mesto, with Gleison Santos moved to opposite direction.

In January 2010, the Genoa winger was officially sent on loan to Bologna.

Parma
On 3 January 2011, the full registration rights of Modesto and Genoa-owned 50% registration rights of Raffaele Palladino, were exchanged with Parma-owned 50% registration rights of Luca Antonelli and Alberto Paloschi. Genoa also paid Parma €5.85M cash. Modesto signed a contract until 2014 and became a regular as a left-back in Pasquale Marino's 4–3–3 formation, or as a left winger in his 3–4–1–2 formation.

Modesto signed on loan to Serie A newcomers for the 2012–13 season, Pescara, on the final day of the 2012 summer transfer window.

Padova
In summer 2013 Modesto was sold to Padova for €250,000, with Bruno Leonardo Vicente moved to opposite direction for an undisclosed fee. He was released by Padova due to bankruptcy.

Crotone
On 29 August 2014 Modesto was signed by Crotone in a 2-year contract.

Rende
In October 2016 Modesto remained in his native Calabria region for Serie D club Rende.

Coaching career
Modesto started his coaching career in 2017 as a youth coach for Rende, then being promoted as head coach for the club's 2018–19 Serie C season, where he guided the small Calabrian club to a historic participation to the promotion playoffs.

He left Rende in June 2019 to become Cesena's new manager, again in Serie C. He was dismissed by Cesena on 27 January 2020, following one draw and three losses in four games prior to that.

On 17 August 2020, he was hired by Serie C club Pro Vercelli. He guided Pro Vercelli to third place in the Group A, then competing in the promotion playoffs.

On 9 June 2021, Modesto was announced as the new head coach of his hometown club Crotone in the Serie B league. He was dismissed on 29 October 2021 following a negative start to the 2021–22 Serie B season, leaving Crotone deep in relegation zone after ten games. He returned to Crotone on 10 December 2021, after the team only gained 1 point in 7 games under his replacement, Pasquale Marino. He was dismissed from his job once again on 29 May 2022, after having failed to save Crotone from relegation to Serie C.

On 8 November 2022, Modesto was hired as the new head coach of Serie C club Vicenza. On 16 March 2023 he was dismissed, after failing to improve the team results.

Personal life
Francesco Modesto had a son Michelangelo Modesto born in 2017.

Career statistics

Managerial statistics

References

External links

 National Squad Statistics at FIGC.it

1982 births
Living people
People from Crotone
Italian footballers
Serie A players
Serie B players
Serie D players
Reggina 1914 players
Association football defenders
Palermo F.C. players
Cosenza Calcio 1914 players
U.S. Vibonese Calcio players
Ascoli Calcio 1898 F.C. players
Genoa C.F.C. players
Bologna F.C. 1909 players
Parma Calcio 1913 players
Delfino Pescara 1936 players
Calcio Padova players
F.C. Crotone players
Italian football managers
Serie C managers
Serie B managers
L.R. Vicenza managers
Footballers from Calabria
Sportspeople from the Province of Crotone